Pacific Far East Line, also called PFEL in short, was a passenger and cargo shipping line founded in 1943 by Thomas E. Cuffe, in San Francisco, California. At the beginning he started by chartering foreign ships to run the lines in tramp trade. Later scheduled cargo services were added to the line.  During World War II the South Atlantic steamship line was active with charter shipping with the Maritime Commission and War Shipping Administration. 

After World War II Pacific Far East Line purchased some of the low-cost surplus ships. All purchased ships were given names ending with the word "Bear".  Pacific Far East Line flag was blue with a golden bear and below the letters PFEL, and Pacific Far East Line ads called PFEL routes "Routes of the Bear". During wartime, the South Atlantic steamship line operated Victory ships and Liberty shipss. Chairman Thomas E. Cuffe died in 1959. Pacific Far East Line operated some Lighter aboard ship (LASH ships). 

In 1977 The US Maritime Subsidy Board approved the application of Pacific Far East Line, Inc. (PFEL) for being granted a construction-differential subsidy (CDS) for financing the reconstruction of four LASH barge carriers into full container ships at Bethlehem Steel's San Francisco shipyard at a cost of U$5 millions each. The four ships were the Thomas E. Cuffe, Golden Bear, Japan Bear, and the Pacific Bear, all built in 1971 and 1972 at Avondale Shipyards, Inc., New Orleans, La. However, as containerization expanded, Pacific Far East Line failed to upgrade sufficiently rapidly its fleet to container ships and modernize as other shipping lines did in the 1970s. With the Vietnam War over Pacific Far East Line lost revenues and eventually went bankrupt and closed in 1978, all ships being sold or scrapped due to age.

Coastwise Line
Coastwise Line was owned-managed by Pacific Far East Line out of San Francisco, with Headquarters at 315 California Street. Coastwise Line was founded by Hector Hunt in 1938 in Portland, Oregon. The ships flew a white and blue flag with "CL" on the Flag.  During World War II the Coastwise Line was active chartering ships. In 1960 Coastwise Line closed. Coastwise Line main ports were New York City, New Orleans, Galveston, Havana, and other ports. Coastwise Line operated ferry lines across San Francisco Bay, riverboats between San Francisco and Sacramento. Coastwise Line has port facilities for transferring equipment across the Sacramento River between Port Costa and Benicia, California. Main route was moving Northwest timber. Coastwise Line operated the Alaska service which ran between the Pacific Coast and British Columbia to/from Alaska. Coastwise Line operated the Columbia River service that ran between Portland, Oregon to/from Long Beach, California.

Lykes Coastwise Line
Lykes-Coastwise Line was a partnership founded in 1934 in Florida, with routes on the east coast, the agreement ended in 1946. Lykes-Coastwise Line also operated charter ships during World War II.

Pacific Far East Line Routes
US homes ports were: Los Angeles and San Francisco. 
 Main foreign ports were: Japan, Yokohama, Kobe, Osaka, Okinawa, Korea, Shanghai, Hong Kong, Taiwan, Vietnam, Guam, Philippines, Manila, Philippine Islands, and Thailand. Also ports in Manchuria. Some ports in the U.S.S.R. in Asia

Ships

Some ships charted or owned by Pacific Far East Line and Coastwise Line:
 SS Canada Bear (was SS Paducah Victory) 
 SS Hawaii Bear
 SS Alaska Bear   (was SS Bluefield Victory) 
 SS India Bear
 SS California Bear
 SS Peter Silvester sank
 SS Golden Bear   LASH carrier  (was Beaver Mariner)
 SS Korean bear (was Sooner Mariner)
 SS Hong Kong Bear C4
 SS Oregon Bear C4
 SS Washington Bear C4  (was Tar Heel Mariner)
 SS Pacific Bear  Sank 
 SS Guam Bear   (renamed SS New Zealand Bear) 
 SS Japan Bear (was Grand Canyon Mariner) 
 SS Tosina
 SS Portland Trader
 SS Nikobar,  Sank 1934 as SS Carlsholm 
 SS Ames Victory 
 SS Anchorage Victory
 SS Boise Victory 
 SS Villanova Victory 
 SS Winthrop Victory charted  for Vietnam War  
 SS Simmons Victory
 SS Greeley Victory 
 SS Owensboro Victory 
 SS Grinnell Victory 
 SS Santa Clara Victory, charted  for Vietnam War  
 SS Rider Victory  
 SS Pan American Victory,  charted  for Vietnam War  
 SS Princeton Victory, charted  for Vietnam War  
 SS Swarthmore Victory charted  for Vietnam War 
 SS Yugoslavia Victory 
 SS Luther Burbank charted  for Vietnam War 
 SS Morgantown Victory  for Vietnam War 
 SS Lyman Stewart 
 SS Morrison R. Waite 
 SS Augustus Thomas 
 SS Henry M. Stephens 
  SS Hiram S. Maxim 
 SS Edwin Abbey 
 SS Chung Tung 
 SS Fleetwood
 SS George Eastman
 SS Rufus King

Coastwise Line Ships
SS Coast Farmer
SS Coast Trader sank
SS Coast Banker
SS Coast Merchant 
SS Coast Shipper
SS Coast Miller
SS Codington
SS Leland Stanford
Coastal Sentry
SS La Grange
SS Abbot L. Mills
SS King S. Woolsey 
 SS Jacob H. Gallinger
 SS James Lick
 SS James W. Cannon
 SS Harry Leon Wilson
SS Harvey W. Wiley
SS Henry Villard
 SS Horace See
 SS Benjamin Bonneville
SS Henry Longfellow
 SS Charles M. Russell
 SS Elizabeth Blackwell

Lykes Coastwise Line ships
Empire Flamingo 
Empire Falcon
 SS Joel Chandler Harris
SS Abbot L. Mills
 Empire Ortolan

PFEL LASH carrier
Two C4-S-1t LASH carrier were built by Bethlehem Shipbuilding Corporation in San Francisco:
 SS China Bear 1962 LASH carrier, scrapped 1986 
 SS Philippine Bear 1962 LASH carrier, scrapped 1986 

The C4-S-1 class, also known as the Mariner class, where the largest of the C4 ships, 37 were built.

PFEL Ro-Ro Ship
 Atlantic Bear was a Roll-on/roll-off ship built in 1976 by Sun Shipyards for the Pacific Far East Line, at 17,300 DWT for $30 million, in 1984 she was renamed Atlantic Spirit in 1989 Kaimoku in 1998 El Yunque.

PFEL Type C7 Ships
Bethlehem Steel's Sparrows Point Shipyard constructed two C7-S-88a container ships for Pacific Far East Line (PFEL). The two new ships were launched as SS Australia Bear and SS New Zealand Bear. Australia Bear was completed in 1973, but before New Zealand Bear had been fully outfitted both ships were sold in 1974 to Sea-Land Service, Inc. and renamed Sea-Land Consumer and Sea-Land Producer as Sealand's SL18P class.  Sea-Land was bought by the CSX Corporation in 1986, and both ships were renamed in 2000. The domestic U.S. liner operations of Sea-Land were sold in 2003 and subsequently operated under the name Horizon Lines. Their service life came in a full circle when Matson, who had initially designed the ships decades earlier, acquired Horizon Lines in 2015. The vessels would serve their new owners a few more years as Matson Consumer and Matson Producer.  They were scrapped in 2018 and 2019 respectively.

PFEL C8-S-81b ships

In the late 1960s, shipbuilding engineer Jerome L. Goldman designed the first LASH ships, Type C8-class ship, the Acadia Forest and the Atlantic Forest. Avondale shipyard start construction in 1969 of the second LASH ships the C8-S-81b. The ten C8-S-81b LASH ships were of identical design and built from 1970 to 1973. The 11 ships were used by two shipping lines Prudential Grace Line in New York and Pacific Far East Line in San Francisco. The price for each ship was $21.3 million.
C8 Barge Carrier ship names:
Thomas E. Cuffe, Golden Bear, Pacific Bear, Japan Bear, and China Bear''

World War II
Coastwise Line fleet of ships were used to help the World War II effort. During World War II Coastwise Line operated Merchant navy ships for the United States Shipping Board. During World War II Coastwise Line was active with charter shipping with the Maritime Commission and War Shipping Administration. Coastwise Line operated Liberty ships and Victory ships for the merchant navy. The ship was run by its Coastwise Line crew and the US Navy supplied United States Navy Armed Guards to man the deck guns and radio.

World War 2 ships:
  SS  Coast Trader June 7, 1942 torpedoed 
  SS  Coast Farmer July 20, 1942 torpedoed 
  SS  Augustus Thomas Oct. 24, 1944 bombed 
  SS  Rufus King July 7, 1942 stranded, broke in two 
  SS  Samuel Heintzelman July 1, 1943 sank by surface raider in Indian Ocean 
  SS  Peter Sylvester Feb. 6, 1945 torpedoed
  SS   Abbot L. Mills  
  SS   Rider Victory  
  SS   Ames Victory  
  SS   Anchorage Victory 
  SS   Anniston Victory 
  SS   Harry Leon Wilson  
  SS   Jacob H. Gallinger  
  SS   Villanova Victory  
  SS   Yugoslavia Victory  
  SS   Boise Victory  
  SS   Princeton Victory  
  SS   Benjamin Bonneville  
  SS   Owensboro Victory  
  SS   Elizabeth Blackwell  
  SS   Simmons Victory  
  SS   Charles M. Russell

See also

World War II United States Merchant Navy

References

Defunct shipping companies of the United States
Transport companies established in 1943
1943 establishments in California